Natalia Andriyivna Livytska-Kholodna (June 15, 1902, in Zolotonosha – April 28, 2005, in Toronto) was a Ukrainian poet, best remembered for her poems Vohon' i popil (1934), Sim liter (1937) and Poeziji stari i nowi (1986). She was the daughter of Andriy Livytskyi, the last prime minister of the Ukrainian People's Republic.

References 

1902 births
2005 deaths
Ukrainian poets
People from Cherkasy Oblast
Canadian people of Ukrainian descent